This is a list of the Estonia national football team results from 2010 to 2019.

2010

2011

2012

2013

2014

2015

2016

2017

2018

2019

See also
Estonia national football team results (1920–1940)
Estonia national football team results (1991–2009)
Estonia national football team results (2020–present)
Estonia national football team all-time record
List of Estonia international footballers

Notes

References

External links
 All matches of the Estonia national football team

 
football results